The Witch from Melchet Street is a 2007 Israeli modern-day urban fairy tale about magic and first love. It is based on a book by Israeli author Gadi Taub and is geared towards both children and adults as it tells the story of the magical summer that Assaf fell in love for the first time with a neighborhood girl and became close friends with the witch who lived on his street.

Summary
The Witch From Melchet Street is told from the perspective of a grown up Assaf, remembering what it was like to be young and in love and the quirky friend who helped him through it. Plagued by her own broken heart, the three-hundred-year-old witch (with a surprisingly youthful appearance) finds it easy to sympathize with her little neighbor friend, who's spending his summer pining over a little neighborhood girl who hardly acknowledges his existence.

Nearly two decades after the summer Assaf is still gripped by his memories. Since then, the little girl has grown up and moved away, but Assaf never left. “When you live in the house you grew up in, your childhood is always right beside you,” he explains. “You buy cigarettes where you used to buy popsicles, you sit at a cafe overlooking your old school.”

Now, when Assaf spots his first love wandering through his neighborhood, he can't help but follow a few steps behind her, keeping her hot pink dress in sight at all times. As he watches her walk, he can't help but remember the brassy little girl who, long ago, showed no remorse while breaking his heart.

Awards
 Official Selection in Istanbul Children's Film Festival, 2007
 Official Selection in Chicago Children's Film Festival, 2007

See also
Other dramas set modern in Israel:
Alila
The Postwoman
You Don't Say
Time of Favor

References

External links
The Jewish Channel's write-up
XXVI OULU International Children's Film Festival
The New Israeli for Cinema and TV write up
KidsFirst.org's write-up

Israeli comedy-drama films
2007 films
2007 comedy-drama films
2000s coming-of-age films
2000s romantic fantasy films
2000s teen fantasy films